George Peabody Steele II (July 27, 1924 – February 13, 2018) was a vice admiral in the United States Navy. He is a former commander of the United States Seventh Fleet (from July 28, 1973 – June 15, 1975) and Commander Naval Forces Korea. He was a 1944 graduate of the United States Naval Academy.

References 

1924 births
2018 deaths
United States Navy admirals
United States Naval Academy alumni
Burials at the United States Naval Academy Cemetery
People from San Francisco